A class action is a form of lawsuit.

Class Action may also refer to:
Class Action (film), 1991, starring Gene Hackman and Mary Elizabeth Mastrantonio
Class Action (band), a garage house band
"Class Action" (Teenage Robot), an episode of My Life as a Teenage Robot
Class Action, a play by Brad Slaight
Class Action, a 2002 book that was the basis for the film North Country
Cla$$ Action, a 2005 novel by Henry Denker